Laura Wright (née Sisk) is an American actress. She is perhaps best known for her roles as Ally Rescott on Loving (1991–1995) and The City (1995–1997), Cassie Layne Winslow on Guiding Light (1997–2005) and Carly Corinthos on General Hospital (2005–present); the latter garnered her the Daytime Emmy Award for Outstanding Lead Actress in a Drama Series in 2011.

Early life
Wright was born Laura Sisk in Washington, D.C., and was raised in Clinton, Maryland. She appeared in several high school plays such as Gypsy, Our Town, and You Can't Take It with You.

Career
Wright (then credited by her maiden name of Sisk) made her television acting debut on ABC's daytime soap opera Loving in 1991, playing the character of Allison "Ally" Rescott Bowman. She also starred in The City from 1995 to 1997 as the same character, and then she played the role of Cassie Layne Winslow on CBS soap opera Guiding Light from 1997 to 2005. On September 12, 2005, Wright was cast as the fourth actress to play the character of Carly Corinthos on ABC's General Hospital. ABC Daytime executive Brian Frons said in a statement, "Carly is a complex character, and we are excited to bring Laura's talent, beauty and intelligence to this role. [...] Fans can look forward to high drama between Sonny, Carly and Alcazar this fall." In a statement, Wright, who was still appearing in episodes of Guiding Light when the announcement was made, said:

In 2009, Wright announced through her official Twitter page that she had signed a four-year contract with the series, ensuring her stay as Carly until sometime in 2013. At the fan club weekend in July 2013, Wright confirmed she had signed another four-year deal with the series. In 2011, after 20 years on soaps, Wright was nominated for a Daytime Emmy Award for her portrayal of Carly in the Outstanding Lead Actress category. Wright won the award at the 38th Daytime Emmy Awards. Wright was later nominated again in the Lead Actress category for the 39th Daytime Emmy Awards. She lost the award to Heather Tom for her portrayal of Katie Logan Spencer on The Bold and the Beautiful. In 2015, Wright made a cameo appearance in the film Joy, alongside General Hospital co-stars Maurice Benard and Donna Mills. She also starred in the Lifetime film Deadly Patient, which premiered December 14, 2018.

Personal life 
Wright married architect John Wright on October 7, 1995. They have two children. In April 2016, Wright announced that she and John decided to end their marriage.

As of 2017, Wright is in a relationship with her former General Hospital co-star Wes Ramsey.

Filmography

Awards and nominations

References

External links
 
 
 Laura Wright Talks 2010 Soap Cruise

Actresses from Maryland
American soap opera actresses
American television actresses
Living people
People from Clinton, Maryland
Daytime Emmy Award winners
Daytime Emmy Award for Outstanding Lead Actress in a Drama Series winners
20th-century American actresses
21st-century American actresses
Year of birth missing (living people)